Neuronal pentraxin-2 is a protein that in humans is encoded by the NPTX2 gene.

Function 

This gene encodes a member of the family of neuronal pentraxins, synaptic proteins that are related to C-reactive protein. This protein is involved in excitatory synapse formation. It also plays a role in clustering of alpha-amino-3-hydroxy-5-methyl-4-isoxazolepropionic acid (AMPA)-type glutamate receptors at established synapses, resulting in non-apoptotic cell death of dopaminergic nerve cells.

Clinical significance 

Up-regulation of this gene in Parkinson disease (PD) tissues suggests that the protein may be involved in the pathology of PD

References

Further reading